William Horatio Powell (July 29, 1892 – March 5, 1984) was an American actor. A major star at Metro-Goldwyn-Mayer, he was paired with Myrna Loy in 14 films, including the Thin Man series based on the Nick and Nora Charles characters created by Dashiell Hammett. Powell was nominated for the Academy Award for Best Actor three times: for The Thin Man (1934), My Man Godfrey (1936), and Life with Father (1947).

Early life
Born in Pittsburgh in 1892, William Powell was the only child of Nettie Manila (née Brady) and Horatio Warren Powell, who worked as an accountant. In 1907, young William moved with his family to Kansas City, Missouri, where he graduated from Central High School four years later.

Career

After high school, Powell enrolled at the University of Kansas, because his parents wanted him to prepare to study law, but after only a week there, he left and relocated to New York City where he attended the American Academy of Dramatic Arts. In 1912, Powell left the AADA at the end of one year, and worked in several vaudeville and stock companies. After several successful experiences on the Broadway stage, he began his Hollywood career in 1922, playing a small role as an evil henchman of Professor Moriarty in a production of Sherlock Holmes with John Barrymore. He later performed as Francis I in When Knighthood Was in Flower with Marion Davies, which was considered the most expensive film production to date.

Under contract to Paramount throughout most of the 1920s, Powell played villains in the early part of his career.  As he gained experience, he gradually shifted into leading-man roles paired with such leading ladies as Bebe Daniels, Evelyn Brent, and Kay Francis. When Powell left Paramount to sign with Warner Bros., Francis joined him. One of their most successful films together was One Way Passage. Between Paramount and Warner Bros., Powell and Francis made seven films together.

His most memorable role in silent movies was as a vengeful film director opposite Emil Jannings' Academy Award-winning performance as a fallen general in The Last Command (1928). This success, along with Powell's commandingly pleasant speaking voice, led to his first starring role as amateur detective Philo Vance in the "talkie" The Canary Murder Case (1929). He played Philo Vance at Paramount Pictures three more times, and once at Warner's in his final appearance in the role in The Kennel Murder Case.

Powell was loved by many people in Hollywood. Actress Marion Shilling worked with him in Shadow of the Law, and called him, "Self-effacing, deferential, exceedingly thoughtful of other people, he was one of the kindest human beings I have ever met. He sensed that I was in awe of him, so from the start, he did what he could to put me at ease."

Powell's most famous role was that of Nick Charles in six Thin Man films, beginning with The Thin Man in 1934, based upon Dashiell Hammett's novel. The role provided a perfect opportunity for Powell, with his resonant speaking voice, to showcase his sophisticated charm and witty sense of humor, and he received his first Academy Award nomination for The Thin Man. Myrna Loy played his wife, Nora, in each of the Thin Man films. Their on-screen partnership, beginning alongside Clark Gable in 1934 with Manhattan Melodrama, was one of Hollywood's most prolific, and they appeared in 14 films together.

Loy and Powell starred in the Best Picture of 1936, The Great Ziegfeld, with Powell in the title role and Loy as Ziegfeld's wife Billie Burke. That same year, he received his second Academy Award nomination, for the comedy My Man Godfrey.

In 1935, he starred with Jean Harlow in Reckless. A serious romance developed between them, and in 1936, they were reunited on screen in the screwball comedy Libeled Lady, that also featured Loy and Spencer Tracy. Harlow became ill soon after, and died from uremia at the age of 26 in June 1937 before they could marry. His distress over her death, as well as a cancer diagnosis of his own, caused him to accept fewer acting roles. Powell's career slowed considerably in the 1940s, although he received his third Academy Award nomination in 1947 for his role as the formidable Clarence Day Sr. in Life with Father. His last film was 1955's Mister Roberts, playing "Doc" alongside Henry Fonda in the title role, James Cagney as the ship's perfectionist captain, and Jack Lemmon in his Oscar-winning performance as Ensign Pulver.

Personal life

On April 15, 1915, Powell married Eileen Wilson, who was born Julia Mary Tierney.  The couple had a son, William David Powell, his only child. They amicably divorced in 1930. Powell's son became a television writer and producer before a period of ill health led to his suicide in 1968.

On June 26, 1931, Powell married actress Carole Lombard. The marriage lasted just over two years. They were divorced in 1933, though they, too, remained on good terms, even starring together in the screwball comedy My Man Godfrey three years later. Powell was devastated by her death in an airplane crash in 1942. He was engaged to marry Jean Harlow, his co-star in Reckless (1935), until her sudden death in 1937. On January 6, 1940, three weeks after they met, Powell married his third wife, actress Diana Lewis, to whom he remained married until his death in 1984.

A Republican, Powell supported Thomas Dewey in the 1944 United States presidential election.

Cancer
In March 1938, Powell was diagnosed with rectal cancer. He underwent surgery and experimental radium treatment, which put the disease in full remission within two years. Given his own health and sorrow over Jean Harlow's death, Powell did not undertake any film roles for over a year during this period.

Death
Powell died in Palm Springs, California, on March 5, 1984, at the age of 91 from pneumonia, nearly 30 years after his retirement. He is buried at the Desert Memorial Park in Cathedral City, California, near his third wife Diana Lewis, and his only child, son William David Powell.

Honors

Academy Awards nominations
 1934 Best Actor – The Thin Man
 1936 Best Actor – My Man Godfrey
 1947 Best Actor – Life with Father

Other awards
New York Film Critics Circle Award for Best Actor in 1947 for Life with Father and The Senator Was Indiscreet.

William Powell has a star on the Hollywood Walk of Fame at 1636 Vine Street.

In 1992, a Golden Palm Star on the Palm Springs, California, Walk of Stars was dedicated to him.

Radio appearances

Filmography

Short subjects
 Screen Snapshots (1932)
 Hollywood on Parade No. A-12 (1933)
 Screen Snapshots: The Skolsky Party (1946)

Box office rankings

1935 - 15th
1936 - 13th
1937 - 5th, 6th (UK)
1938 - 25th, 10th (UK)
1940 - 25th
1941 - 25th

See also

 List of actors with Academy Award nominations

References

Bibliography
 Bryant, Roger. William Powell: The Life and Films. Jefferson, North Carolina: McFarland & Co., 2006. .
 Christensen, Lawrence O., et al. Dictionary of Missouri Biography. Columbia, Maryland: University of Missouri Press, 1999. .
 Francisco, Charles. Gentleman: The William Powell Story . New York: St Martins Press, 1985. .

External links

 William Powell
 
 Photographs of William Powell
 FBI file on William Powell
 

1892 births
1984 deaths
Burials at Desert Memorial Park
Male actors from Pittsburgh
American Academy of Dramatic Arts alumni
American male silent film actors
Male actors from Kansas City, Missouri
20th-century American male actors
Metro-Goldwyn-Mayer contract players
Paramount Pictures contract players
California Republicans